Alleizettella leucocarpa is a species of flowering plant, a member of the family Rubiaceae.

Description

References 

Gardenieae